Yenni Thuniga is a 2022 Indian Tamil-language action thriller film written and directed by S.K.Vettri Selvan and Produced by Suresh Subramanian. The film was under Production House Rain Of Arrows Entertainment. The film was distributed by Krikes Cine Creations. The film features Jai and Athulya Ravi in the lead roles while Vamsi Krishna was cast in as the main antagonist and Sunil Reddy also appears in a negative role as a politician. The film's music is composed by Sam CS with cinematography handled by J. B. Dinesh Kumar and editing done by V. J. Sabu Joseph. The film was released theatrically on 4 August 2022.

Plot

After a heist job by Madhan and gang to rob a precious cargo became a mess, he is under pressure to deliver the loot to the overlords. Things begin to get complicated when Kathir appears and disrupts Madhan’s plan and reveals what happened that day.

Cast 

 Jai as Kathir
 Athulya Ravi as Narmada
 Anjali Nair as a victim's wife
 Vamsi Krishna as Madhan
 Vidya Pradeep as Teja
 Marimuthu as Kathir's father
 Sunil Reddy as 'Needhi' Manikkam
 Kuraishi as Saravanan
 Munnar Ramesh
 Abhishek Shankar as Doctor
 Suresh Subramanian as Sam
 Kimberly Ziler as Naomi
Maurice Johnson as Joe

Production 
On 11 December 2019 Vetrimaaran revealed the official title of the film. On 22 February 2021, AR Murugadoss unveiled the first look poster of the film.

Music 
The film's soundtrack was composed by Sam CS. The first single was released on 15 December 2021.

The movie theme song "Yenni Thuniga", a metal track was composed by producer Suresh Subramanian. Sung by Super Singer fame Divagar, Suresh Subramanian, Arsan Suresh, Rapper Hyde Karthy, written by Senthamizh, and recorded in Los Angeles and Chennai, this song was used in the movie's rolling credits at the end.

Release 
The film was released theatrically on 4 August 2022.

Reception
M. Suganth of The Times of India gave the film 1.5 out of 5 stars stating that "Only a couple of plot developments make us sit up. One involves the interval twist, which plays with the expectations that non-linear narratives have built in us and another about the mystery of the missing diamonds. But for the rest of the time, the film gets us close to a state of stupor, making us wonder if the title is a fair warning to us, audiences." Avinash Ramachandran of Cinema Express gave 3 out of 5 stars and stated that "Now, we just have a handful of names doing the rounds, and if Jai’s recent filmography is anything to go by, then he seems to have become calculative and has bravely taken to this course." Moviecrow rated the film 2.5 out of 5 and stated that "A bunch of regular things makes this action thriller a not-so-thrilling outing. However, Yenni Thuniga is a harmless one-time watch." Chennai Vision gave the film’s rating 3.2 out of 5, stating that "Sam CS makes a mark with his BGM and rest of the technical aspects are good." Thangaraja Palaniappan of News Bricks after reviewing the film stated that "Jai has showcased himself in good action roles more than as a romantic hero." Behindwoods gave the film’s rating 2.25 out of 5 stars, stating that "A heist film with some doses of twists and drama makes it watchable."

References

External links 
 
 

2020s Tamil-language films
Indian action thriller films
2022 action thriller films